Pierre-Jean Ducis (5 March 1907 - 24 June 1980) was a French film director. He mainly directed short films.

Filmography 
 1932: Le Dernier Preux
 1933: Gudule
 1933: Deux picon-grenadine
 1933: 
 1934: 
 1934: Quatre à Troyes
 1934: Un Petit Trou pas cher
 1934:  (short film)
 1934:  (short film)
 1935: 
 1935: Le Crime de monsieur Pégotte
 1935: Les Deux Docteurs
 1935: La Clef des champs
 1936: Au son des guitares
 1936: Œil de lynx, détective
 1936: La Souris bleue
 1936:  The Assault 
 1937: In the Sun of Marseille
 1938: 
 1940: 
 1941: Strange Suzy
 1943:

External links 
 

Film directors from Paris
1907 births
1980 deaths